The Lingqu is a canal in Xing'an County, Guangxi, China. 

Lingqu may also refer to:

Lingqu, Tibet

See also
Chu Lingqu (褚令璩), an empress of the Chinese dynasty Southern Qi